Edelweiß is the second studio album released by Joachim Witt in 1982.

Track listing 
All tracks composed and arranged by Joachim Witt
 "Inflation Im Paradies (Filmmusik)"  "Inflation in Paradise"   - 3:09
 "Tri-tra-Trullala (Herbergsvater)"  "Warden"  - 4:46
 "Ich fahr´nach Afrika"  "I'm Going To Africa"  - 3:41
 "Exil"  "Exile"  - 4:11
 "Mutter Natur - Oder das Echo von Euskirchen"  "Mother Nature - Or the Echo of Euskirchen"  - 3:09
 "Ich Bin Der Deutsche Neger"  "I am the German Negro"  - 5:02
 "Warten Auf Das Grosse Glück"  "Waiting on the Great Happiness"  - 3:01
 "Denn Ich Bin So Einsam"  "Because I am So Lonely"  - 3:23
 "Kuwait" - 2:43
 "Strenges Mädchen"  "Strict Girl"  - 5:20

Personnel
Joachim Witt - vocals, guitar, organ, synthesizer
Harald Gutowski - bass
Jaki Liebezeit - drums 
Eva-Maria Gößling - saxophone on "Inflation Im Paradies (Filmmusik)" 

1982 albums
Joachim Witt albums